Charles Elijah Fish (January 5, 1857 – July 3, 1933) was a businessman and political figure in New Brunswick, Canada. He represented Northumberland County in the Legislative Assembly of New Brunswick from 1899 to 1903 and Northumberland in the House of Commons of Canada from 1925 to 1926 as a Conservative member.

He was born and educated in Newcastle, New Brunswick, the son of the lumber and flour merchant James A. Fish and Elizabeth McAllister. He was a lieutenant in the local militia. Fish became a lumber merchant and building contractor, in 1885 purchasing the French Fort Cove quarry in Newcastle and securing that year the contract to supply sandstone for construction of the Langevin Block in Ottawa.

Fish later served on the council for Northumberland County, also serving as county warden, and was at one time mayor of Newcastle. Serving just two years as a Member of Parliament, he was defeated in a bid for reelection to the House of Commons in 1926.

He married Annie Willard and their daughter, Frances Lillian Fish became a lawyer, the first woman admitted to the Nova Scotia Bar.

Electoral record

References 

 Canadian Parliamentary Guide, 1926, Al Normandin

1857 births
1933 deaths
Businesspeople from New Brunswick
Canadian businesspeople in timber
Canadian construction businesspeople
Members of the House of Commons of Canada from New Brunswick
Conservative Party of Canada (1867–1942) MPs
Mayors of places in New Brunswick
Mayors of Miramichi, New Brunswick
Progressive Conservative Party of New Brunswick MLAs